This is a list of Romanian football transfers for the 2021 summer transfer window. Only moves featuring 2021–22 Liga I and 2021–22 Liga II are listed.

Liga I

Academica Clinceni

In:

Out:

Argeș Pitești

In:

Out:

Botoșani

In:

Out:

CFR Cluj

In:

Out:

Chindia Târgoviște

In:

Out:

Dinamo București

In:

Out:

Farul Constanța

In:

Out:

FC U Craiova

In:

Out:

FCSB

In:

Out:

Gaz Metan Mediaș

In:

Out:

Mioveni

In:

Out:

Rapid București

In:

Out:

Sepsi Sfântu Gheorghe

In:

Out:

Universitatea Craiova

In:

Out:

UTA Arad

In:

Out:

Voluntari

In:

Out:

Liga II

1599 Șelimbăr

In:

Out:

Astra Giurgiu

In:

Out:

Brașov

In:

Out:

Buzău

In:

Out:

Concordia Chiajna

In:

Out:

Dacia Unirea Brăila

In:

Out:

Dunărea Călărași

In:

Out:

Hermannstadt

In:

Out:

Metaloglobus București

In:

Out:

Miercurea Ciuc

In:

Out:

Petrolul Ploiești

In:

Out:

Politehnica Iași

In:

Out:

Politehnica Timișoara

In:

Out:

Ripensia Timișoara

In:

Out:

Steaua București

In:

Out:

Unirea Constanța

In:

Out:

Unirea Dej

In:

Out:

Unirea Slobozia

In:

Out:

Universitatea Cluj

In:

Out:

Viitorul Târgu Jiu

In:

Out:

References

Romania
2021